Jarosław Leszek Wałęsa (born 13 September 1976 in Gdańsk) is a Polish politician. He was elected to the Sejm on 25 September 2005, getting 14,709 votes in 25 Gdańsk district as a candidate from the Civic Platform list. He is the son of former Polish President Lech Wałęsa.

Wałęsa is a 1995 graduate of Glastonbury High School, in Connecticut, where he spent his high school years as a foreign exchange student.  He then attended the College of the Holy Cross in Worcester, Massachusetts.

On 2 September 2011 Jarosław was seriously injured riding his motorcycle after colliding with a SUV in Stropkowo near Sierpc. His injuries included a broken spine and dozens of fractures; and he was still undergoing corrective surgeries in July 2015.

He married Ewelina Jachymek in a civil ceremony in 2012, and in a convent in 2013. Their son Wiktor was born in March 2014, becoming the twelfth grandson of Lech Wałęsa.

In the European Parliament election June 2009, he became a member of the European parliament. In 2014, he was re-elected.

He lost his brother, Przemyslaw, (born 1974), Lech Wałęsa's third son, a border guard, who lived in the Morena district in Gdańsk, on 8 January 2017.

Wałęsa became the new head of the Civic Institute, said to be the think tank of Civic Platform, a Polish political party, on 16 June 2015.

See also
Members of Polish Sejm 2005-2007

References

External links

Jarosław Wałęsa - parliamentary page - includes declarations of interest, voting record, and transcripts of speeches.

1976 births
Living people
Politicians from Gdańsk
Polish Roman Catholics
Civic Platform politicians
Children of national leaders
Members of the Polish Sejm 2005–2007
Members of the Polish Sejm 2007–2011
Members of the Polish Sejm 2019–2023
College of the Holy Cross alumni
Polish expatriates in the United States
Civic Platform MEPs
MEPs for Poland 2009–2014
MEPs for Poland 2014–2019
University of Gdańsk alumni